Popowo Tomkowe  is a village in the administrative district of Gmina Mieleszyn, within Gniezno County, Greater Poland Voivodeship, in west-central Poland.

References

Popowo Tomkowe